The Nam Pung Dam is a hydroelectric dam on the Phung River in the Kut Bak District of Sakon Nakhon Province, Thailand.

References

Dams in Thailand
Dams in the Mekong River Basin
Rock-filled dams
Hydroelectric power stations in Thailand
Isan
Buildings and structures in Sakon Nakhon province
Dams completed in 1965
1965 establishments in Thailand
Energy infrastructure completed in 1965